An intraarticular fracture is a bone fracture in which the break crosses into the surface of a joint. This always results in damage to the cartilage. Compared to extraarticular fractures, intraarticular have a higher risk for developing long-term complications, such as posttraumatic osteoarthritis. Treatment considerations include restoring joint surface congruity and maintaining joint alignment and stability.

See also
 Intracapsular fracture

References

Bone fractures